English words of Ukrainian origin are words in the English language that have been borrowed or derived from the Ukrainian language.
Some of them may have entered English via Russian, Polish, or Yiddish, among others. They may have originated in another languages, but are used to describe notions related to Ukraine.  Some are regionalisms, used in English-speaking places with a significant Ukrainian diaspora population, especially Canada, but all of these have entered the general English vocabulary.

Some words such as knyaz are traced back to the times of Kievan Rus, and hence claimed both by Russians and Ukrainians, both claiming the Kievan Rus heritage.

English words from Ukrainian

Cuisine 

Borsch (Ukrainian: борщ borshch), beet soup, also used in the expression "cheap like borscht".

Kasha (Ukrainian: ка́ша), a porridge.

Paska (Ukrainian: па́ска, "Easter" = "paskha"). A rich Ukrainian dessert made with soft cheese, dried fruit, nuts, and spices, traditionally eaten at Easter.

Syrniki, sometimes also sirniki (Ukrainian: си́рники syrnyky, from сир syr, originally soft white cheese in Slavic languages). Fried quark cheese pancakes, garnished with sour cream, jam, honey, or apple sauce.

Ethnic 

Boyko or Boiko (Ukrainian: бо́йко), a distinctive group of Ukrainian highlanders or mountain-dwellers of the Carpathian highlands. 

Cossack (Ukrainian: коза́к kozak), a freedom-loving horseman of the steppes.

Hutsul (Ukrainian: гуцу́л), an ethno-cultural group who for centuries have inhabited the Carpathian Mountains.

Lemko (Ukrainian: ле́мко), a distinctive group of Ukrainian highlanders or mountain-dwellers of the Carpathian highlands.

Rusyn (Ukrainian: руси́н), an ethnic group of Ukrainians. Old self-name of the Ukrainians

Verkhovynian or Verkhovynets (Ukrainian: верховинець), a distinctive group of Ukrainian highlanders or mountain-dwellers of the Carpathian highlands.

Politic 

Banderist (Ukrainian: банде́рівець), a member of the Organization of Ukrainian Nationalists or of the Ukrainian Insurgent Army.

Boyar (Ukrainian: singular боя́рин boiaryn, plural боя́ри boiary), a member of the highest rank of the feudal Russian, Bulgarian, Romanian,  and Ukrainian aristocracy, second only to the ruling princes, from the 10th century through the 17th century.  Many headed the civil and military administrations in their country.

Rukh (Ukrainian: Рух; movement), a Ukrainian centre-right political party the People's Movement of Ukraine.

Sich (Ukrainian: Січ), the administrative and military centre for Cossacks.

Verkhovna Rada (Ukrainian: Верхо́вна Ра́да), the Ukraine's parliament, literally Supreme Council, formerly also translated as the Supreme Soviet.

Other 
Gley (Ukrainian: глей) - a sticky clay soil or soil layer formed under the surface of some waterlogged soils. Ukrainian gleĭ clayey earth; akin to Old English clǣg clay.

Hryvnia or sometimes hryvnya (Ukrainian: гри́вня), the national currency of Ukraine since 1996.

Hucul or hutsul (Ukrainian: гуцульський кінь, гуцулик or гуцул), a pony or small horse breed originally from the Carpathian Mountains. 

Karbovanets (Ukrainian: карбо́ванець), Ukrainian currency in 1917-1920, 1942-1945 and in 1992-1996.

Khorovod (Ukrainian: хорово́д), a Slavic art form consisting of a combination of a circle dance and chorus singing, similar to Chorea of ancient Greece.

Kniaz (Ukrainian: князь knyaz', etymologically related to the English word king from Old English cyning, meaning "tribe", related the German König, and the Scandinavian konung, probably borrowed early from the Proto-Germanic Kuningaz, a form also borrowed by Finnish and Estonian "Kuningas"; the title and functions however of a Kniaz corresponded, though not exact, to more of a Prince or Duke), a title given to members of Ukrainian nobility that arose during the Rurik dynasty.

Kurgan (Ukrainian: курга́н "tumulus"), a type of burial mound found in Eastern Europe and Central Asia.

Naftohaz or Naftogaz (Ukrainian: Нафтогаз), the national oil and gas company of Ukraine, literally "Oil and gas".

Steppe (Ukrainian: степ) is one of the vast usually level and treeless tracts in southeastern Europe or Asia. The word is likely to come from French, where previously it had been taken from Polish, where it said to be originated from Ukrainian.

Surzhyk (Ukrainian: су́ржик), a mixed (macaronic) sociolects of Ukrainian and Russian languages used in certain regions of Ukraine and adjacent lands.

Tachanka (Ukrainian: тача́нка), a horse-drawn machine gun platform.

References 

 Katherine Barber, editor (2004). The Canadian Oxford Dictionary, second edition. Toronto: Oxford University Press. .
 Katherine Barber (2008). Only in Canada, You Say: A Treasury of Canadian Language.  Toronto: Oxford University Press. .

See also 

 Canadian Ukrainian, a diaspora variation or dialect of Ukrainian
 List of words of Russian origin, many of which also appear in Ukrainian, or are closely related
 List of English words of Yiddish origin, some of which originate in Slavic languages, including Ukrainian
 Lists of English words of international origin

Ukrainian
 
Ukrainian loanwords